Tyrone Forge is an unincorporated community and census-designated place (CDP) in Blair County, Pennsylvania, United States. It was first listed as a CDP prior to the 2020 census.

The CDP is in northeastern Blair County, in the southeastern part of Snyder Township. It sits on the west bank of the Little Juniata River at the eastern end of its water gap between Brush Mountain and Bald Eagle Mountain. Tyrone Forge is bordered to the north by the Pittsburgh Line of the Norfolk Southern Railway. Pennsylvania Route 453 runs just north of the railway, connecting Tyrone to the west with Birmingham to the southeast.

References 

Census-designated places in Blair County, Pennsylvania
Census-designated places in Pennsylvania